In mathematics, the Yang–Mills–Higgs equations are a set of non-linear partial differential equations for a Yang–Mills field, given by a connection, and a Higgs field, given by a section of a vector bundle (specifically, the adjoint bundle). These equations are 

with a boundary condition

where
 A is a connection on a vector bundle,
 D is the exterior covariant derivative,
 F is the curvature of that connection,
 Φ is a section of that vector bundle,
 ∗ is the Hodge star, and
 [·,·] is the natural, graded bracket.

These equations are named after Chen Ning Yang, Robert Mills, and Peter Higgs.  They are very closely related to the Ginzburg–Landau equations, when these are expressed in a general geometric setting.

M.V. Goganov and L.V. Kapitanskii have shown that the Cauchy problem for hyperbolic Yang–Mills–Higgs equations in Hamiltonian gauge on 4-dimensional Minkowski space have a unique  global solution with no restrictions at the spatial infinity. Furthermore,  the solution has the finite propagation speed property.

Lagrangian 
The equations arise as the equations of motion of the Lagrangian density

where  is an invariant symmetric bilinear form on the adjoint bundle. This is sometimes written as  due to the fact that such a form can arise from the trace on  under some representation; in particular here we are concerned with the adjoint representation, and the trace on this representation is the Killing form. 

For the particular form of the Yang-Mills-Higgs equations given above, the potential  is vanishing.

This theory is a particular case of scalar chromodynamics where the Higgs field  is valued in the adjoint representation as opposed to a general representation.

See also 

 Yang–Mills equations
 Scalar chromodynamics

References
M.V. Goganov and L.V. Kapitansii, "Global solvability of the initial problem for Yang-Mills-Higgs equations", Zapiski LOMI 147,18–48, (1985); J. Sov. Math, 37, 802–822 (1987).

Partial differential equations